is a town located in Gunma Prefecture, Japan. , the town had an estimated population of 7,058 in 3,292 households, and a population density of 37 persons per km². Shimonita is famous for its konjac and Welsh onion.

Geography
Shimonita is located in southwestern Gunma Prefecture bordering on Nagano Prefecture to the west. Part of the town is within the borders of the Myōgi-Arafune-Saku Kōgen Quasi-National Park. Approximately 84% of the town's total area is covered by forests.

 Mountains: Mount Arafune (1423 m), Mount Inafukumi, Mount Ōgeta, Ozawadake, Kanatake, Mount Nikkura, Mount Yotsumata, Mount Monogatari, Mount Midō, Mount Myogi, Mount Monomi
 Rivers: Kabura River

Surrounding municipalities
Gunma Prefecture
 Fujioka
 Tomioka
Annaka
Nanmoku
 Kanna
 Kanra
Nagano Prefecture
 Saku
 Karuizawa

Climate
Shimonita has a Humid continental climate (Köppen Cfa) characterized by warm summers and cold winters with heavy snowfall.  The average annual temperature in Shimonita is 11.7 °C. The average annual rainfall is 1106 mm with September as the wettest month. The temperatures are highest on average in August, at around 31.1 °C, and lowest in January, at around -0.5 °C.

Demographics
Per Japanese census data, the population of Shimonita has decreased steadily over the past 70 years.

History
During the Edo period, the area of present-day Shimonita was largely part of the tenryō territory held directly by Tokugawa shogunate within Kōzuke Province.  The town of Shimonita was created within Kitakanra District of Gunma Prefecture on April 1, 1889 with the creation of the modern municipalities system after the Meiji Restoration. In 1950 Kitakanra District was renamed Kanra District.  Shimonita annexed the neighboring villages of Osaka, Saimoku, Aokura and Mayama on March 10, 1955.

Government
Shimonita has a mayor-council form of government with a directly elected mayor and a unicameral town council of 12 members. Shimonita, together with the other municipalities in Kanra District contributes one member to the Gunma Prefectural Assembly. In terms of national politics, the town is part of Gunma 5th district of the lower house of the Diet of Japan.

Economy
The economy of Shimonita is heavily dependent on agriculture.

Education
Shimonita has one public elementary school and one public middle school operated by the town government and one public high school operated by the Gunma Prefectural Board of Education.

Transportation

Railway
 Jōshin Dentetsu - Jōshin Line

Highway
  – Shimonita IC

Local attractions
Shimonita Onsen

Noted people from Shimonita
Miyuki Imori, actress, entertainer

References

External links

Official Website 

Towns in Gunma Prefecture
Shimonita, Gunma